Tallinn City Government is the executive body, which conducts the work of all institutions (except City Council Office) and subinstitutions of Tallinn, Estonia. The body's building is located at Vabaduse Square.

The body has eight members: mayor and seven deputy mayors. Current (2023) mayor is Mihhail Kõlvart. The work of the body takes place as session. Regular sessions takeks places on Wednesdays.

Before WWII, the body used Tallinn Town Hall.

References

External links
 

Tallinn
Local government in Estonia